The American Breed is an American bovid hybrid of cattle with a small percentage of American Bison blood. It was developed in the 1950s by a New Mexico rancher looking for beef cattle which could survive on poor fodder in the arid Southwest. 

It is one of the few cattle breeds with any known Bison influence, another being the Beefalo. Art Jones, the original breeder, began by crossing Hereford, Shorthorn and Charolais, and later added extensive crosses with Brahman and Bison. All individuals of this rare breed display the genetic marker for Bison ancestry. 

In 2007 its conservation status was unknown. A breed society was established in 1976; in 2016 it was inactive.

References

Cattle breeds originating in the United States
Cattle breeds
Intergeneric hybrids